2018 was the first seasons in top-tier of Thai football league, Thai League 1 . This season, the club sent the team under the name of PT Prachuap F.C. for sponsorship purposes.

On this season, PT Prachaup F.C. participate in 3 official competitions, Thai League T1, Chang FA Cup and Toyota League Cup.

Kit
Supplier: Warrix Sports Kit Manufacturer  shirt sponsorship: PTG Energy

Upcoming Match

Last match result

Players

Current squad

Out on loan

Foreign players registration

The number of foreign players is restricted to five per Thai League team (3 foreign players, 1 AFC player and 1 ASEAN player) . A team can use four foreign players on the field in each game, including at least one player from the AFC country.

Note: Flags indicate national team as has been registered to the official Thai League T1. Players may hold more than one FIFA and non-FIFA nationality.

Season Friendly Matches

Competitions

Thai League 1

Table

Results by matchday

Matches

Chang FA Cup

Toyota League Cup

Season goalscorers & Man of the Match list
Below is a list of PT Prachaup F.C. goalscorer and man of the match (MoM) statistic on 2018 season, Recorded after a game of 2018 Thai League T1 with Suphanburi, .

Hat-tricks Hero

Season Transfers
First Thai footballer's market is opening on November 14, 2017, to February 5, 2018    Second Thai footballer's market is opening on June 11, 2018, to July 9, 2018

In

Out

Loan in

Loan out

References

External links
 Thai League 2 website

PT Prachuap F.C. seasons
Association football in Thailand lists
PTP